Zadock Cook (February 18, 1769 – August 3, 1863) was a United States representative from Georgia.

Biography
He was born in Virginia and moved to Hancock County, Georgia in early life.  He was one of the first white settlers in Clarke County, Georgia. He was self-educated. He served as an Ensign in the Washington County Militia in 1793 and a Captain of the Eleventh Company, Hancock County Militia, in 1796.

Cook was member of the Georgia House of Representatives in 1806, 1807, and again in 1822.  He served in the Georgia Senate 1810–1814, 1823, and 1824. He was elected as a Republican to the 14th United States Congress to fill the vacancy caused by the resignation of Alfred Cuthbert. He was reelected to the 15th Congress and served from December 2, 1816, to March 3, 1819. He retired from public life and settled on his plantation near Watkinsville, Georgia and engaged in agricultural pursuits until his death in 1863. He was buried in Jackson Cemetery, Clarke (now Oconee) County, Georgia. He was also a slave owner.

References

External links 

1769 births
1863 deaths
People from Virginia
Members of the Georgia House of Representatives
Georgia (U.S. state) state senators
Democratic-Republican Party members of the United States House of Representatives from Georgia (U.S. state)
People from Hancock County, Georgia
People from Clarke County, Georgia
People from Oconee County, Georgia
American slave owners